(born March 6, 1947) is a Japanese retired professional wrestler. Popularly known as Killer Khan, he was billed from Mongolia and had numerous high-profile matches with André the Giant in the World Wrestling Federation (WWF) during the 1980s, including a high profile "Mongolian stretcher match". Khan used Asian mist against opponents.

Professional wrestling career
Ozawa's Mongolian giant character was created by Karl Gotch. He traveled to America in 1979 to wrestle. The following year, in 1980, Khan first wrestled André the Giant in a tag team match for Georgia Championship Wrestling. Later that same year, he was hired by the World Wrestling Federation (WWF). In the WWF, Khan originally feuded with WWF Champion Bob Backlund, as well as the WWF Intercontinental Champion Pedro Morales.

Khan was then placed in feud with André the Giant. During one match in May 1981, a kayfabe Khan kneedrop off of the top turnbuckle resulted in André the Giant breaking his ankle, as Khan accidentally landed on it. The truth was that Andre actually broke his ankle getting out of bed. The incident had been reported as real and as a storyline to help put Khan over. When Andre returned from his injury, he and Khan feuded into the next year. In November 1981 in Philadelphia Andre defeated Khan in a "Mongolian Stretcher match." The feud was named Wrestling Observer Newsletters Feud of the Year.

In 1984 in Canada's Stampede Wrestling, he had a series of matches with Archie "The Stomper" Gouldie. On January 20, 1984, he won the Stampede North American Heavyweight Championship from Gouldie in a street fight. In March, he lost the title to Dynamite Kid.

Khan made a brief return to the WWF in 1987, managed by Mr. Fuji, where he feuded with Outback Jack. In addition, he had a limited house show run challenging WWF Champion Hulk Hogan.
He also had successful runs as a monster heel in Mid-South Wrestling and NWA World Class Championship Wrestling.  Usually managed by Skandar Akbar, the WCCW run saw him team with the Freebirds (teaching Terry Gordy the Oriental Spike), then turning on him, paid by Akbar.

Personal life
Khan had a role as a bodyguard in the movie 3 Ninjas Kick Back, and a cameo in 2006 Japanese special effects action series Lion-Maru G. Khan currently owns a restaurant in Tokyo, Japan. He is married to Cindy Ozawa of Lutz, Florida, though the two live on separate continents. He has three children: Yukie, Yoshiko, and David Masato. All of them reside in the United States.

On December 9, 2020, around 5:00 PM, Khan was involved in a hit and run at his hometown of Tokyo, Japan. According to authorities in the Shinjuku Ward, he allegedly struck a woman who was riding a bike in the Hyakunincho area, then fled the scene. The woman suffered a broken tooth in the accident and sustained other injuries that took about a month to heal. Khan later apologized for the incident and stated that he was in a hurry to get to his restaurant. He was not charged nor prosecuted.

Championships and accomplishmentsChampionship Wrestling from FloridaNWA United States Tag Team Championship (Florida version) (1 time) - with Pak Song
NWA United States Tag Team Championship Tournament (1979) - with Pak SongMid-South Wrestling AssociationMid-South Louisiana Championship (1 time)
Mid-South Mississippi Heavyweight Championship (1 time)
Mid-South Louisiana Championship Tournament (1982)Stampede WrestlingStampede North American Heavyweight Championship (1 time)World Class Championship WrestlingWCCW Television Championship (1 time)Pro Wrestling IllustratedPWI Feud of the Year (1981) vs. André the Giant
PWI Match of the Year (1981) vs. André the Giant on May 2
PWI ranked him # 176 of the 500 best singles wrestlers during the PWI Years in 2003.Wrestling Observer Newsletter'''''
Feud of the Year (1981) vs. André the Giant

Footnotes

References

External links
居酒屋カンちゃん: Official site
 

1947 births
Faux Mongolian professional wrestlers
Japanese male professional wrestlers
Living people
People from Tsubame, Niigata
Sportspeople from Niigata Prefecture
Stampede Wrestling alumni
20th-century professional wrestlers
NWA United States Tag Team Champions (Florida version)
Stampede Wrestling North American Heavyweight Champions